The starry smooth-hound (Mustelus asterias) is a houndshark of the family Triakidae.

Description
It is grey or greyish-brown with a scattering of small white spots on its dorsal (upper) surface and white on its ventral (under) surface. It is a long, lean fish with a somewhat rounded snout and rows of shallowly projecting teeth. The two dorsal fins are of similar shape, but the hindmost one is a little smaller than the foremost. A notch occurs in the upper lobe of the caudal fin and the lower lobe is of medium size.

Distribution and habitat
This species of houndshark is found in the eastern Atlantic Ocean and the Mediterranean Sea. Its range extends from off southern Norway, Scotland, and the North Sea southwards to Algeria, Morocco, and off the Western Sahara. It is found in the whole of the Mediterranean, but not in the Black Sea. It is found on the continental shelf and around islands at depths to at least  and prefers places where the seabed is sand or gravel.

This species of houndshark was found in the Thames River of London in 2021, and Plymouth National Marine Park in April 2022

Biology
The starry smooth-hound mostly feeds on crustaceans, such as crabs, lobsters, and slipper lobsters, and  molluscs. It is an ovoviviparous fish, retaining its eggs in its oviduct, where the young are nourished by the egg yolk and the oviduct's secretions.

Status
The IUCN, in its Red List of Threatened Species, lists the starry smooth-hound as "near threatened". In the Mediterranean Sea, it is less common and is targeted for human consumption along with the closely related common smooth-hound (Mustelus mustelus). Numbers in the Mediterranean have dwindled and in this region it might qualify for "Vulnerable" status were it not plentiful elsewhere.

References

Further reading
 Compagno, Dando, & Fowler, Sharks, Collins Gem, HarperCollins, London (2006) 

starry smooth-hound
Marine fish of Europe
Fish of the Mediterranean Sea
Marine fauna of North Africa
Taxa named by Hippolyte Cloquet
starry smooth-hound